Anna Wood (born Annemarie Cox on 22 July 1966) is a Dutch-born Australian sprint canoeist who competed from the early 1980s to the early 2000s (decade). Competing in four Summer Olympics, she won two bronze medals in the K-2 500 m, earning them in 1988 with the Netherlands and 1996 with Australia.

Wood also won eight medals at the ICF Canoe Sprint World Championships with three golds (K-2 500 m: 1998, K-2 1000 m: 1998, 1999), four silvers (K-1 5000 m: 1991, K-2 500 m: 1987, 1997; K-2 1000 m: 1997), and a bronze (K-2 500 m: 1985).

She also represented the Dutch kayak team from 1983 to 1989.

Wood's husband, Steven (1961–95), won a bronze in the K-4 1000 m event at the 1992 Summer Olympics in Barcelona. She was an Australian Institute of Sport scholarship holder 1990–1994.

References

ABC.net.au profile

1966 births
Living people
Australian female canoeists
Dutch female canoeists
Australian Institute of Sport canoeists
Canoeists at the 1988 Summer Olympics
Canoeists at the 1992 Summer Olympics
Canoeists at the 1996 Summer Olympics
Canoeists at the 2000 Summer Olympics
Dutch emigrants to Australia
ICF Canoe Sprint World Championships medalists in kayak
Olympic canoeists of Australia
Olympic canoeists of the Netherlands
Olympic bronze medalists for Australia
Olympic bronze medalists for the Netherlands
Olympic medalists in canoeing
People from Roermond
Medalists at the 1996 Summer Olympics
Medalists at the 1988 Summer Olympics
Sportspeople from Limburg (Netherlands)